The 1977 Currie Cup was the 39th edition of the Currie Cup, the premier annual domestic rugby union competition in South Africa.

Fixtures and Results

Final

See also

 Currie Cup

References

1977
1977 in South African rugby union
1977 rugby union tournaments for clubs